is a city located in Fukuoka Prefecture, Japan.

As of April 30, 2011, the city has an estimated population of 71,848, with 24,507 households and a population density of 934.55 persons per km². The total area is 76.88 km².

On March 21, 2005 the towns of Yamato and Mitsuhashi (both from Yamato District) were merged into Yanagawa.

Yanagawa is popular with Japanese tourists because of its 470 km of wide canals. Yanagawa riverboats, called "donkobune", are used to take tourists around the city. In 1987 a video documentary was created by Studio Ghibli about these canals and their restoration.

 is widely available and includes English subtitles.

Yanagawa was originally constructed in the mid-16th century by the Kamachi clan. Before then, it had been a traditional farming village, with the canals used for irrigation; Tanaka Yoshimasa (Japanese: 田中吉政; 1548 – 1609) ordered the canals to be maintained and built a castle in Yanagawa, which is still maintained today. The modern city was founded on April 1, 1952.

Yanagawa is the birthplace of Kitahara Hakushu, a Meiji era poet and writer of children's songs. An annual three-day festival is held every November in Yanagawa complete with poetry readings, fireworks, music, and a great number of evening boat rides. During this festival, most activities begin from Shimohyaku Town and center at the Hiyoshi Shinto Shrine. In addition, Hakushu's birth house is located in Yanagawa and open to the public for tours. The Yanagawa Municipal Folk Museum is mainly dedicated to preservation of Hakushu-sensei's works and memorabilia.

During the months of March and April, Yanagawa also plays host to a number of festivals, most notably Hinamatsuri or Girls' Festival on March 3. A great number of finely crafted Heian era styled dolls are placed on display in a number of private homes, shops, and businesses throughout the city. During this time, a number of local citizens actually open up their homes to the public, allowing people to come and see their elaborate decorations and displays.

References

External links

 Yanagawa City official website 
 Yanagawa page of Fukuoka Prefecture Tourism Association Website (archive)
 Official website of the Ohana Villa in Yanagawa; a popular local attraction
 A local guide for English speakers visiting the Yanagawa area (archive)

 
Cities in Fukuoka Prefecture